Autodrómo Internacional de Las Américas is a paved circuit built in 1998, located near the capital city of the Dominican Republic, Santo Domingo. Its full-length layout is officially approved by the FIA as a Grade Four course. While only an 11 turn,  road course, it is considered to be highly challenging as well as equally rewarding. The circuit is on the Caribbean Coast, which can be seen just behind Turn One.

History 

In 2005, the Circuit played host to the Second Round of the Grand-Am Cup (now Michelin Pilot Challenge), the Miller Grand-Am Cup 200. It is currently used as a local proving grounds for the best of Caribbean talent, through weekly races and almost a day-by-day usage in race-training purposes.

Racing

Miller Grand-Am Cup 200 [GS Class Only] Results

Notes and references

External links
 

Motorsport venues in the Dominican Republic
Sports venues in Santo Domingo